The canton of Le Nord-Médoc is an administrative division of the Gironde department, southwestern France. It was created at the French canton reorganisation which came into effect in March 2015. Its seat is in Lesparre-Médoc.

It consists of the following communes:
 
Bégadan
Blaignan-Prignac
Cissac-Médoc
Civrac-en-Médoc
Couquèques
Gaillan-en-Médoc
Grayan-et-l'Hôpital
Jau-Dignac-et-Loirac
Lesparre-Médoc
Naujac-sur-Mer
Ordonnac
Pauillac
Queyrac
Saint-Christoly-Médoc
Saint-Estèphe
Saint-Germain-d'Esteuil
Saint-Julien-Beychevelle
Saint-Sauveur
Saint-Seurin-de-Cadourne
Saint-Vivien-de-Médoc
Saint-Yzans-de-Médoc
Soulac-sur-Mer
Talais
Valeyrac
Vendays-Montalivet
Vensac
Le Verdon-sur-Mer
Vertheuil

References

Cantons of Gironde